Carenzia serrata is a species of extremely small deep water sea snail, a marine gastropod mollusk in the family Seguenziidae.

Distribution
This marine species occurs off New Caledonia.

References

 Marshall, B.A. (1991). Mollusca Gastropoda: Seguenziidae from New Caledonia and the Loyalty Islands, in: Crosnier, A. et al. (Ed.) (1991). Résultats des campagnes MUSORSTOM: 7. Mémoires du Muséum national d'Histoire naturelle. Série A, Zoologie, 150: pp. 41–109

External links
 To Encyclopedia of Life
 To World Register of Marine Species

serrata
Gastropods described in 1991